Slobodan "Piksi" Subotić (born 15 August 1956) is a Slovenian professional basketball coach and former player. He last served as the head coach for Budućnost of the ABA League, Montenegrin League and the EuroCup. 

He has Greek citizenship, which he obtained to circumvent EU administrative restrictions while playing and coaching there. To be able to obtain Greek citizenship, he had to administratively change his name in the eyes of Greek law, and is thus known there as Slompontan "Lefteris" Soumpotits. In addition to having Slovenian and Greek citizenship, he also holds Bosnian citizenship. At 2.02 m (6'7 ") tall, he was a talented swingman, with incredible shooting ability.

Playing career
Subotić helped the Greek club Aris to qualify for the EuroLeague's Final Four in three consecutive years (1988, 1989 and 1990). With Aris, he was a five time Greek League champion, in the years 1987, 1988, 1989, 1990 and 1991, and also a five time Greek Cup winner, in the years 1987, 1988, 1989, 1990 and 1992.

Subotić then followed-up a successful playing career, by moving on to work as a basketball coach.

Coaching career
After his playing career, Subotić went into coaching. So far, some of the clubs that he has been the head coach of include: Greek clubs Iraklis, AEK, Aris, Panathnaikos, Panionios, PAOK and Olympiacos, Croatian club Split and Al Riyadi of the Lebanese Basketball League.

As the head coach, he won the Greek League championship twice, in 1998 and 1999, the Greek Cup in 2002,
the FIBA Korać Cup in 1997 and the Lebanese League championship in 2014 and 2015. He extended his contract with Al Riyadi for three more years in 2015.

He was also an assistant coach with the senior men's Slovenia national team in 1999, as well as the head coach of Slovenia from 2001 to 2003, coaching them at the 2003 EuroBasket. In 2012 he became the general manager of the Slovenian club Union Olimpija.

On 18 June 2017, Subotić was named the head coach of Croatian club Cibona, with which he parted ways on 11 November 2017.

In the 2020–21 season, he coached Club Africain in the Tunisian Championnat National A.

Awards and accomplishments

Player
5× Greek League Champion: (1986–87, 1987–88, 1988–89, 1989–90, 1990–91)
5× Greek Cup Winner: (1987, 1988, 1989, 1990, 1992)

Head coach
FIBA Korać Cup Champion: (1996–97)
2× Greek League Champion: (1997–98, 1998–99)
Greek Cup Winner: (2002)
2× Greek League Best Coach: (1998, 1999)
3× Lebanese League Champion: (2013–14, 2014–15, 2015–16)

References

External links
EuroLeague Coaching Profile
EuroCup Coaching Profile
FIBA Europe Coaching Profile
Italian League Coaching Profile 
Interperformances Coaching Profile
GPK Sports Coaching Profile

1956 births
Living people
AEK B.C. coaches
Aris B.C. coaches
Aris B.C. players
Aurora Basket Jesi coaches
Bosnia and Herzegovina basketball coaches
Bosnia and Herzegovina men's basketball players
Greek basketball coaches
Greek Basket League players
Greek basketball executives and administrators
Greek men's basketball players
Greek people of Serbian descent
Iraklis Thessaloniki B.C. coaches
KK Budućnost coaches
KK Cedevita coaches
KK Olimpija players
KK Split coaches
Montenegrin emigrants to Slovenia
Naturalized citizens of Greece
Olympiacos B.C. coaches
Panathinaikos B.C. coaches
Panionios B.C. coaches
P.A.O.K. BC coaches
People from Herceg Novi
Shooting guards
Slovenian basketball coaches
Slovenian men's basketball players
Slovenia national basketball team coaches
Slovenian people of Serbian descent
Small forwards
Al Riyadi Club Beirut basketball coaches